The Budapest Memorandum on Security Assurances comprises three substantially identical political agreements signed at the OSCE conference in Budapest, Hungary, on 5 December 1994, to provide security assurances by its signatories relating to the accession of Belarus, Kazakhstan and Ukraine to the Treaty on the Non-Proliferation of Nuclear Weapons (NPT). The three memoranda were originally signed by three nuclear powers: the Russian Federation, the United Kingdom and the United States. China and France gave somewhat weaker individual assurances in separate documents.

The memoranda, signed in Patria Hall at the Budapest Convention Center with US Ambassador Donald M. Blinken amongst others in attendance, prohibited the Russian Federation, the United Kingdom and the United States from threatening or using military force or economic coercion against Ukraine, Belarus, and Kazakhstan, "except in self-defence or otherwise in accordance with the Charter of the United Nations." As a result of other agreements and the memorandum, between 1993 and 1996, Belarus, Kazakhstan and Ukraine gave up their nuclear weapons.

Content
According to the three memoranda, Russia, the US and the UK confirmed their recognition of Belarus, Kazakhstan and Ukraine becoming parties to the Treaty on the Non-Proliferation of Nuclear Weapons and effectively abandoning their nuclear arsenal to Russia, and that they agreed to the following:

 Respect the signatory's independence and sovereignty in the existing borders.
 Refrain from the threat or the use of force against the signatory.
 Refrain from economic coercion designed to subordinate to their own interest the exercise by the signatory of the rights inherent in its sovereignty and thus to secure advantages of any kind.
 Seek immediate Security Council action to provide assistance to the signatory if they "should become a victim of an act of aggression or an object of a threat of aggression in which nuclear weapons are used".
 Refrain from the use of nuclear arms against the signatory.
 Consult with one another if questions arise regarding those commitments.

History
Until Ukraine gave up the Soviet nuclear weapons stationed on its soil, it had the world's third-largest nuclear weapons stockpile, of which Ukraine had physical but no operational control. Russia controlled the codes needed to operate the nuclear weapons through electronic Permissive Action Links and the Russian command and control system, although this could not be sufficient guarantee against Ukrainian access. Formally, these weapons were controlled by the Commonwealth of Independent States. Belarus only had mobile missile launchers, and Kazakhstan had chosen to quickly give up its nuclear warheads and missiles to Russia. Ukraine went through a period of internal debate on their approach.

Preliminaries
On 23 May 1992, Russia, the U.S., Belarus, Kazakhstan and Ukraine signed the Lisbon Protocol to the START I treaty, ahead of ratifying the treaty later. The protocol committed Belarus, Kazakhstan and Ukraine to adhere to the NPT as non-nuclear weapons states as soon as possible. However, the terms for the transfer of the nuclear warheads were not agreed, and some Ukrainian officials and parliamentarians started to discuss the possibility of retaining some of the modern Ukrainian built RT-23 (SS-24) missiles and Soviet built warheads.

In 1993, two regiments of UR-100N (SS-19) missiles in Ukraine were withdrawn to storage because warhead components were past their operational life, and Ukraine's political leadership realised that Ukraine could not become a credible nuclear military force as they could not maintain the warheads and ensure long term nuclear safety. Later in 1993, the Ukrainian and Russian governments signed a series of bilateral agreements giving up Ukrainian claims to the nuclear weapons and the Black Sea Fleet, in return for $2.5 billion of gas and oil debt cancellation and future supplies of fuel for its nuclear power reactors. Ukraine agreed to ratify the START I and NPT treaties promptly. This caused severe public criticism leading to the resignation of Ukrainian Defence Minister Morozov. On 18 November 1993, the Rada passed a motion agreeing to START I but renouncing the Lisbon Protocol, suggesting Ukraine would only decommission 36% of missile launchers and 42% of the warheads on its territory, and demanded financial compensation for the tactical nuclear weapons removed in 1992. This caused U.S. diplomatic consternation, and the following day Ukrainian President Kravchuk said "we must get rid of [these nuclear weapons]. This is my viewpoint from which I have not and will not deviate." He then brought a new proposal to the Rada.

On 15 December 1993, U.S. Vice President Al Gore visited Moscow for a meeting. Following side discussions, a U.S and Russian delegation, including U.S. Deputy Secretary of Defense William J. Perry, flew to Ukraine to agree to the outlines of a trilateral agreement including U.S. assistance in dismantling the nuclear systems in Ukraine and compensation for the uranium in nuclear warheads. Participants were invited to Washington on 3–4 January to finalise the agreement. A Trilateral Statement with a detailed annex was agreed, based on the previously agreed terms but with detailed financial arrangements and a firm commitment to an early start to the transfer of at least 200 warheads to Russia and the production in Russia of nuclear reactor fuel for Ukraine. Warheads would be removed from all RT-23s (SS-24) within 10 months. However Ukraine did not want a commitment to transfer all warheads by 1 June 1996 to be made public for domestic political reasons, and Russia did not want the financial compensation for uranium made public because they were concerned that Belarus and Kazakhstan would also demand this. It was decided to exclude these two matters from the published agreement, but cover them in private letters between the countries' presidents.

Another key point was that U.S. State Department lawyers made a distinction between "security guarantee" and "security assurance", referring to the security guarantees that were desired by Ukraine in exchange for non-proliferation. "Security guarantee" would have implied the use of military force in assisting its non-nuclear parties attacked by an aggressor (such as Article 5 of the North Atlantic Treaty for NATO members) while "security assurance" would simply specify the non-violation of these parties' territorial integrity. In the end, a statement was read into the negotiation record that the (according to the U.S. lawyers) lesser sense of the English word "assurance" would be the sole implied translation for all appearances of both terms in all three language versions of the statement.

President Clinton made a courtesy stop at Kyiv on his way to Moscow for the Trilateral Statement signing, only to discover Ukraine was having second thoughts about signing. Clinton told Kravchuk not signing would risk major damage to U.S.-Ukraine relations. After some minor rewording, the Trilateral Statement was signed by the three presidents in Moscow in front of the media on 14 January 1994.

The Budapest Memoranda

The "Budapest Memorandum" is actually three documents signed individually on 5 December 1994 by the three leaders of the ex-Soviet nations, together with the guarantor nations: United States, United Kingdom and Russia. So the UNTERM portal notes for one: "To distinguish this from the other two Budapest Memorandums of the same date, this one could be referred to as the 'Budapest Memorandum regarding Kazakhstan.

Sequels

After this was agreed, the U.S. used its Nunn–Lugar Cooperative Threat Reduction programme to provide financial assistance over $300 million (equivalent to $ million in ), and technical assistance in decommissioning the nuclear weapons and delivery systems, which took to 2008 to fully complete. The U.S. also doubled other economic aid to Ukraine to $310 million (equivalent to $ million in ) for 1994.

In 2009, Russia and the United States released a joint statement that the memorandum's security assurances would still be respected after the expiration of the START Treaty.

2013 Belarus sanctions
In 2013, the government of Belarus complained that American sanctions against it were in breach of Article 3 of the Memorandum. The US government responded that its sanctions were targeted at combating human rights violations and other illicit activities of the government of Belarus and not the population of Belarus.

2014 Russian annexation of Crimea

In February 2014, Russian forces seized or blockaded various airports and other strategic sites throughout Crimea. The troops were attached to the Russian Black Sea Fleet stationed in Crimea, which placed Russia in violation of the Budapest Memorandum. The Russian Foreign Ministry had confirmed the movement of armoured units attached to the Black Sea Fleet in Crimea but asserted that they were acting within the scope of the various agreements between the two countries. Russia responded by supporting a referendum on whether the Crimea should join it. The Crimean parliament announced a referendum on Crimea's future in accordance with the law "On the Autonomous Republic of Crimea". On 16 March the referendum was held, on 17 March Crimea declared independence and on 21 March it was incorporated into the Russian Federation. Ukraine vigorously protested the action as a violation of Article 1 of the Budapest Memorandum.

After the annexation of Crimea by Russia in 2014, Canada, France, Germany, Italy, Japan, the UK, and US stated that Russian involvement was a breach of its Budapest Memorandum obligations to Ukraine and in violation of Ukrainian sovereignty and territorial integrity.

On 1 March the Address of the Verkhovna Rada of Ukraine to the Guarantor States in accordance with the Budapest Memorandum of 1994 on Security Assurances in connection with Ukraine's accession to the Treaty on the Non-Proliferation of Nuclear Weapons was published.

On 4 March the Russian president Vladimir Putin replied to a question on the violation of the Budapest Memorandum, describing the current Ukrainian situation as a revolution: "a new state arises, but with this state and in respect to this state, we have not signed any obligatory documents". Russia stated that it had never been under obligation to "force any part of Ukraine's civilian population to stay in Ukraine against its will". Russia suggested that the US was in violation of the Budapest Memorandum and described the Euromaidan as a US-instigated coup.

On 24 March 2014, Canadian Prime Minister Stephen Harper led the G7 partners in an ad hoc meeting during the Nuclear Security Summit, at The Hague, for a partial suspension of Russian membership from the G8 due to Russia's breach of the Budapest Memorandum. He said that Ukraine had given up its nuclear weapons "on the basis of an explicit Russian assurance of its territorial integrity. By breaching that assurance, President Putin has provided a rationale for those elsewhere who needed little more than that already furnished by pride or grievance to arm themselves to the teeth." Harper also indicated support for Ukraine by saying he would work with the new Ukrainian government towards a free trade agreement.

In February 2016, Sergey Lavrov claimed, "Russia never violated Budapest memorandum. It contained only one obligation, not to attack Ukraine with nukes." However, Canadian journalist Michael Colborne pointed out that "there are actually six obligations in the Budapest Memorandum, and the first of them is 'to respect the independence and sovereignty and the existing borders of Ukraine'". Colborne also pointed out that a broadcast of Lavrov's claim on the Twitter account of Russia's embassy in the United Kingdom actually "provided a link to the text of the Budapest Memorandum itself with all six obligations, including the ones Russia has clearly violated – right there for everyone to see." Steven Pifer, an American diplomat who was involved in drafting the Budapest Memorandum, later commented on "the mendacity of Russian diplomacy and its contempt for international opinion when the foreign minister says something that can be proven wrong with less than 30 seconds of Google fact-checking?" Russia argued that the United States broke the third point of the agreement by introducing and threatening further sanctions against the Yanukovych government.

On 20 April 2016, Ukraine established the Ministry of Reintegration of Temporarily Occupied Territories, to manage occupied parts of the Donetsk, Luhansk and Crimea regions, which are affected by Russian military intervention of 2014.

Kerch Strait incident

On 25 November 2018, the Russian Federal Security Service (FSB) coast guard fired upon and captured three Ukrainian Navy vessels after they attempted to transit from the Black Sea into the Sea of Azov through the Kerch Strait on their way to the port of Mariupol.
On 27 November 2018, the Ministry of Foreign Affairs of Ukraine appealed to the signatory states of the Budapest Memorandum to hold urgent consultations to ensure full compliance with the memorandum's commitments and the immediate cessation of Russian aggression against Ukraine.

2022 Russian invasion of Ukraine

Ukrainian President Volodymyr Zelenskyy has publicly commented on the Budapest Memorandum by arguing that it provides no true guarantee of safety due to Russia's coercive power. On 19 February 2022, Zelenskyy made a speech at the Munich Security Conference in which he said "Since 2014, Ukraine has tried three times to convene consultations with the guarantor states of the Budapest Memorandum [i.e. United States and United Kingdom]. Three times without success. Today Ukraine will do it for the fourth time. ... If they do not happen again or their results do not guarantee security for our country, Ukraine will have every right to believe that the Budapest Memorandum is not working and all the package decisions of 1994 are in doubt." Putin used Zelenskyy's comments as part of his claims that Ukraine could develop nuclear weapons. Critics have disputed Putin's claims. This treaty has since been violated by Russia at the outbreak of the 2022 Russian invasion of Ukraine.

Analysis
Under the agreement, the signatories offered Ukraine "security assurances" in exchange for its adherence to the Treaty on the Non-Proliferation of Nuclear Weapons. The memorandum bundled together a set of assurances that Ukraine had already held from the Conference on Security and Co-operation in Europe (CSCE) Final Act, the United Nations Charter and the Non-Proliferation Treaty but the Ukrainian government found it valuable to have these assurances in a Ukraine-specific document.

The Budapest Memorandum was negotiated at political level, but it is not entirely clear whether the instrument is devoid entirely of legal provisions. It refers to assurances, but unlike guarantees, it does not impose a legal obligation of military assistance on its parties. According to Stephen MacFarlane, a professor of international relations, "It gives signatories justification if they take action, but it does not force anyone to act in Ukraine." In the US, neither the George H. W. Bush administration nor the Clinton administration was prepared to give a military commitment to Ukraine, and they did not believe the US Senate would ratify an international treaty and so the memorandum was adopted in more limited terms. The memorandum has a requirement of consultation among the parties "in the event a situation arises that raises a question concerning the ... commitments" set out in the memorandum. Whether or not the memorandum sets out legal obligations, the difficulties that Ukraine has encountered since early 2014 may cast doubt on the credibility of future security assurances that are offered in exchange for nonproliferation commitments. Regardless, the United States publicly maintains that "the Memorandum is not legally binding", calling it a "political commitment".

Ukrainian international law scholars such as Olexander Zadorozhny maintain that the Memorandum is an international treaty because it satisfies the criteria for one, as fixed by the 1969 Vienna Convention on the Law of Treaties (VCLT) and is "an international agreement concluded between States in written form and governed by international law".

China and France gave security assurances for Ukraine in separate documents. China's governmental statement of 4 December 1994 did not call for mandatory consultations if questions arose but only for "fair consultations". France's declaration of 5 December 1994 did not mention consultations.

Scholars assumed at the time that Ukraine's decision to sign the Budapest Memorandum was proof of Ukraine's development as a democracy and its desire to step away from the post-Soviet world and make first steps toward a European future. For 20 years, until the 2014 Russian military occupation of regions of Ukraine, the Ukrainian nuclear disarmament was an exemplary case of nuclear non-proliferation. Since the invasions of Ukraine by Russia the wisdom of Ukraine relinquishing its nuclear weapons has been questioned.

See also
 2022 Russian invasion of Ukraine
 Minsk Agreement
 Normandy Format
 Nuclear weapons and Ukraine
 Russian military intervention in Ukraine (2014–present)
 Russian–Ukrainian Friendship Treaty

References

External links
 Text of the Budapest Memorandum regarding Belarus in the United Nations Treaty Series 
 Text of Budapest Memorandum (Kazakhstan)
 Text of the Budapest Memorandum regarding Ukraine in the United Nations Treaty Series 

Text of Budapest Memorandum 
 Pavlo Hai-Nyzhnyk Росія проти України (1990–2016 рр.): від політики шантажу і примусу до війни на поглинання та спроби знищення. – К.: «МП Леся», 2017. – 332 с. 

Treaties concluded in 1994
Treaties entered into force in 1994
Military history of Ukraine
20th-century military history of Russia
Nuclear proliferation
Foreign relations of Belarus
Foreign relations of Russia
Foreign relations of Kazakhstan
Foreign relations of the United Kingdom
Foreign relations of the United States
Foreign relations of Ukraine
Ukraine–United Kingdom relations
Russia–Ukraine relations
Treaties of Belarus
Treaties of Russia
Treaties of Kazakhstan
Treaties of the United Kingdom
Treaties of the United States
Treaties of Ukraine
1994 in Belarus
1994 in Ukraine
1994 in Kazakhstan
1994 in Russia
1994 in British politics
1994 in American politics
1990s in Budapest
1994 in Hungary
December 1994 events in Europe
Events affected by annexation of Crimea by the Russian Federation
Multilateral relations of Ukraine